The 2008 J. League Division 2 season is the 37th season of the second-tier club football in Japan and the 10th season since the establishment of J2 League.  The season started on March 8 and ended on December 6.

In this season, the number of participating clubs was increased by two, making the total number, fifteen.  Unlike the first nine seasons, the clubs played in triple round-robin format, instead of quadruple round-robin format.  At the end of the season, top two clubs were promoted and third-placed club advanced to the Pro/Rele Series.  There were no relegation to third-tier Japan Football League.

General

Promotion and relegation
 At the end of the 2007 season, Consadole Sapporo, Tokyo Verdy 1969 and Kyoto Sanga  were promoted to J1
 At the end of the 2007 season, Sanfrecce Hiroshima, Ventforet Kofu and Yokohama FC were relegated to J2
 At the end of the 2007 season, Rosso Kumamoto and FC Gifu were promoted from the JFL.

Changes in competition format
 The Division 2 was expanded to 15 clubs.
 The new J2 format will consist of triple round-robin instead of quadruple round-robin to reduce the games played by team to 42 games.

Changes in clubs
Rosso Kumamoto was renamed Roasso Kumamoto before joining the League.

Clubs

Following fifteen clubs played in J. League Division 2 during 2008 season. Of these clubs, Sanfrecce Hiroshima, Ventforet Kofu, and Yokohama F.C. relegated from Division 1 last year.  Also, Roasso Kumamoto and F.C. Gifu newly joined from Japan Football League.

 Vegalta Sendai
 Montedio Yamagata
 Mito HollyHock
 Thespa Kusatsu
 Yokohama F.C. 
 Shonan Bellmare
 Ventforet Kofu  
 F.C. Gifu 
 Cerezo Osaka
 Sanfrecce Hiroshima  
 Tokushima Vortis
 Ehime F.C.
 Avispa Fukuoka
 Sagan Tosu
 Roasso Kumamoto

League format
Fifteen clubs will play in triple round-robin format, a total of 42 games each. A club receives 3 points for a win, 1 point for a tie, and 0 points for a loss. The clubs are ranked by points, and tie breakers are, in the following order:
 Goal differential
 Goals scored
 Head-to-head results
 Disciplinary points
A draw would be conducted, if necessary.  However, if two clubs are tied at the first place, both clubs will be declared as the champions. The top two clubs will be promoted to J1, while the 3rd placed club plays a two-legged Promotion/relegation series.
Changes from Previous Year
 Thirteen participating clubs (2006–2007) to fifteen clubs (2008)
 Quadruple round-robin format (1999–2007) to triple round-robin format (2008–2009)
 Introduction of Disciplinary points for tie breaker (2008–)

Final league table

Final results

Top scorers

Attendance

References

J2 League seasons
2
Japan
Japan